The White House Acquisition Trust is a private, non-profit, tax-exempt fund established to finance the purchase of fine art and decorative arts for the White House, the official home and principal workplace of the president of the United States. The fund is funded by private donation, through individual citizens and corporations. The trust is administered by the White House Historical Association.

In May 2006 the White House Acquisition Trust reported net assets of $8,485,245 on IRS Form 990.

See also
 Art in the White House
 White House Endowment Trust
 White House Historical Association
 Committee for the Preservation of the White House

References
 Clinton, Hillary Rodham. An Invitation to the White House: At Home with History. Simon & Schuster: 2000. .
 Garrett, Wendell. Our Changing White House. Northeastern University Press: 1995. .

External links
White House Historical Association decorative arts timeline

White House
White House Executive Residence Operations